Jammu and Kashmir State Ranbir Penal Code or RPC was the main criminal code applicable in the erstwhile Indian state of Jammu and Kashmir. The Indian Penal Code, applicable elsewhere in India, was not applicable here under Article 370 of the Constitution of India. 

It came into force in 1932. The code was introduced during the reign of Maharaja Ranbir Singh and hence named after him. It was made on the lines of Indian Penal Code prepared by Thomas Babington Macaulay. The Parliament of India passed the bill to scrap provisions of Article 370 of the Indian Constitution on 5 August 2019. The constitution of India which was applicable to the rest of India except Jammu and Kashmir, has now become applicable all over India. The state of Jammu and Kashmir (J&K) has got divided into the Union Territories of J&K and  Ladakh  after the successful passage of the Jammu and Kashmir Reorganization Bill in the Rajya Sabha and Lok Sabha respectively. The Ranbir Penal Code has thus been dissolved. Henceforth, the Indian Penal Code has come into force in the region.

References

Criminal codes
State legislation in India
Jammu and Kashmir Legislature
1932 in law
1932 in India
Crime in Jammu and Kashmir